Little David was the nickname of an American World War II mortar.

Little David may also refer to:

 Little David Records, a record label started in 1969 by comedian Flip Wilson and his manager
 Little David, a pseudonym of David Porter (musician) (born 1969), American record producer, songwriter, singer, entrepreneur and philanthropist
 Little David Wilkins (born 1945), American country music singer, songwriter and pianist
 Little David, a spaceship in the novel Between Planets by Robert Heinlein